Tortyra spectabilis is a moth of the family Choreutidae. It is known from Brazil and Costa Rica.

References

Tortyra
Moths described in 1863